The city of Jeffersonville is the largest city and county seat of Twiggs County, Georgia, United States.  The population was 1,035 at the 2010 census, down from 1,209 in 2000.

Jeffersonville is part of the Macon Metropolitan Statistical Area.

History
The city was named after the Jefferson family of settlers. Jeffersonville was named county seat in 1868, when the seat was transferred from Marion.

Geography
Jeffersonville is located at  (32.683982, -83.339683).

The city is located in the central part of the state, very close to the geographic center of the state. Interstate 16 runs northwest to southeast just south of the city, leading southeast 148 mi (238 km) to Savannah and northwest 25 mi (40 km) to Macon. U.S. Route 80 travels through the city, as well as state routes 18 and 96.

Demographics

2020 census

As of the 2020 United States census, there were 977 people, 375 households, and 199 families residing in the city.

2000 census
As of the census of 2000, there were 1,209 people, 436 households, and 320 families residing in the city. The racial makeup of the city was 36.72% White, 62.37% African American, 0.25% Native American, 0.17% Asian, 0.08% from other races, and 0.41% from two or more races. Hispanic or Latino of any race were 2.73% of the population.

There were 436 households, out of which 28.2% had children under the age of 18 living with them, 45.2% were married couples living together, 23.9% had a female householder with no husband present, and 26.6% were non-families. 23.9% of all households were made up of individuals, and 9.6% had someone living alone who was 65 years of age or older.  The average household size was 2.67 and the average family size was 3.18.

In the city, the population was spread out, with 25.0% under the age of 18, 10.1% from 18 to 24, 28.8% from 25 to 44, 23.9% from 45 to 64, and 12.2% who were 65 years of age or older.  The median age was 36 years. For every 100 females, there were 85.1 males.  For every 100 females age 18 and over, there were 82.1 males.

The median income for a household in the city was $25,000, and the median income for a family was $37,500. Males had a median income of $29,722 versus $21,042 for females. The per capita income for the city was $13,021.  About 17.4% of families and 21.4% of the population were below the poverty line, including 30.9% of those under age 18 and 21.2% of those age 65 or over.

Education

Twiggs County School District 
The Twiggs County School District holds pre-school to grade twelve, and consists of four elementary schools (two include pre-school programs), a middle school and a high school. The district has 100 full-time teachers and over 1,489 students.
Jeffersonville Elementary
Twiggs Middle School
Twiggs County High School

Private education 
Twiggs Academy

References

Cities in Georgia (U.S. state)
Cities in Twiggs County, Georgia
County seats in Georgia (U.S. state)
Macon metropolitan area, Georgia